The United States of Greater Austria was an unrealized proposal made in 1906 to federalize Austria-Hungary to help resolve widespread ethnic and nationalist tensions. It was conceived by a group of scholars surrounding Archduke Franz Ferdinand of Austria, notably by the ethnic Romanian lawyer and politician Aurel Popovici.

Nationality conflict
The first program for the federalisation of the Habsburg Empire was developed by the Hungarian nobleman Wesselényi Miklós. In his work titled Szózat a magyar és a szláv nemzetiség ügyében, published in Hungarian in 1843 and in German in 1844, he proposed not only social reforms but reforms of the state structure of the Empire and its nationality policy. He aimed to replace the centralized empire with a federation of five states: a German state, a state of Bohemia and Moravia, Galicia as a Polish state, and the state of historical Hungary

Another idea came from Hungarian revolutionary Lajos Kossuth: "True liberty is impossible without federalism". Kossuth proposed to transform the Habsburg Empire into a "Danubian State", a federal republic with autonomous regions.

The Austro-Hungarian Compromise of 1867 established the dual monarchy of Austria-Hungary. The Compromise partially re-established the sovereignty of the Kingdom of Hungary, separate from and no longer subject to the Austrian Empire. However, the favoritism shown to the Magyars, the second largest ethnic group in the dual monarchy after the Germans, caused discontent on the part of other ethnic groups like the Slovaks and Romanians.

As the twentieth century started to unfold, the greatest problem facing the dual monarchy of Austria-Hungary was that it consisted of about a dozen distinctly different ethnic groups, of which only two, the Germans and Hungarians (who together accounted for about 44% of the total population), wielded any power or control. The other ethnic groups, which were not involved in the state affairs, included Slavic (Bosniaks, Croats, Czechs, Poles, Ruthenians, Serbs, Slovaks, Slovenes and Ukrainians) and Romance peoples (Italians, Romanians). Among them, only Croats had limited autonomy in the Kingdom of Croatia and Slavonia. In the Kingdom of Hungary, several ethnic minorities faced increased pressures of Magyarization.

The idea of the Dual Monarchy system of 1867 had been to transform the previous Austrian Empire into a constitutional union, one German-dominated and one Hungarian-dominated part, having also common institutions. However, after various demonstrations, uprisings and acts of terrorism, it became readily apparent that the notion of two ethnic groups dominating the other ten could not survive in perpetuum.

Franz Ferdinand had planned to redraw the map of Austria-Hungary radically, creating a number of ethnically and linguistically dominated semi-autonomous "states" which would all be part of a larger federation renamed the United States of Greater Austria. Under this plan, language and cultural identification was encouraged, and the disproportionate balance of power would be corrected. The idea was set to encounter heavy opposition from the Hungarian part of the Dual Monarchy, since a direct result of the reform would have been a significant territorial loss for Hungary.

However, the Archduke was assassinated at Sarajevo in 1914, triggering the outbreak of the First World War. After the war, Austria-Hungary was dismantled and several new nation-states were created, and various Austro-Hungarian territories were ceded to neighbouring countries at the Paris Peace Conference (see Treaty of Saint-Germain-en-Laye and Treaty of Trianon).

States proposed by Aurel Popovici

According to Popovici's plans, the following 15 territories were to become states of the federation after the reform. The majority ethnic group within each territory is also listed.

Deutsch-Österreich: German-Austria (present-day Austria with the Italian province of South Tyrol, the Bohemian Forest and South Moravia regions—the southern part of the later Sudetenland—in the present-day Czech Republic, as well as the Burgenland region in western Hungary including Sopron/Ödenburg, Mosonmagyaróvár/Wieselburg and Pressburg), ethnic German
Deutsch-Böhmen: German Bohemia (Sudetenland territory in northwestern Bohemia, present-day Czech Republic), ethnic German
Deutsch-Mähren: German Moravia (northeastern Sudetenland in Moravia and Austrian Silesia, present-day Czech Republic, later named Province of the Sudetenland), ethnic German
Böhmen: Bohemia proper (southern and central part of Bohemia and Moravia in the present-day Czech Republic), ethnic Czech
Slowakenland: roughly present-day Slovakia, ethnic Slovak
West-Galizien: West Galicia (the western part of the Kingdom of Galicia and Lodomeria in present-day Poland), ethnic Polish
Ost-Galizien: East Galicia (the eastern part of the Kingdom of Galicia and Lodomeria and the adjacent Bukovina lands, in present-day Ukraine and Poland), ethnic Rusyn and Ukrainian
Ungarn: Hungary (present-day Hungary with parts of southern Slovakia, Transcarpathia - today Ukraine, and the northern Vojvodina region in present-day Serbia), ethnic Magyar
Seklerland: Székely Land (part of present-day Romania), ethnic Magyar
Siebenbürgen: Transylvania, most of the Banat and Bukovina (part of present-day Romania, Serbia and Ukraine), mainly ethnic Romanian, with Magyar and German minorities
Trient: Trentino (part of present-day Italy), ethnic Italian
Triest: Trieste and Gorizia (parts of present-day Italy), western Istria (part of present-day Croatia and Slovenia), mainly ethnic Italian, with Slovenian and Croatian minorities
Krain: Carniola (roughly present-day Slovenia with the Slovene-speaking territory of southern Carinthia), ethnic Slovene
Kroatien: Croatia (present-day Croatia, Srijem in present-day Serbia and Boka Kotorska in present-day Montenegro), ethnic Croatian and Serb
Woiwodina: Vojvodina (part of present-day Serbia and Croatia), mainly Serb and Croatian, with Magyar, Romanian, German and Slovak minorities.

In addition, a number of mostly German-speaking enclaves in eastern Transylvania, the Banat and other parts of Hungary, southern Slovenia, large cities (such as Prague, Budapest, Lviv, and others) and elsewhere were to have autonomy within the respective territory.

See also 
 Trialism in Austria-Hungary, an alternative reform movement to turn the dual Austria-Hungary into a triple Austro-Hungarian-Croatian state
 National personal autonomy, an alternative reform suggested by Austrian Marxists
 Treaty of Saint-Germain-en-Laye (1919)
 Treaty of Trianon
 Austro-Slavism
 Lajos Kossuth
 Count Karl Sigmund von Hohenwart
 Count Kasimir Felix Badeni
 Aurel Popovici
 Oszkár Jászi
 Milan Hodža
 Karl Renner
 Richard von Coudenhove-Kalergi
 Wolfgang Schüssel
 Koruna Česká (party)
 Black-Yellow Alliance
 Democratic Peasants' Party (Bukovina)
 Ethnic federalism

References

External links
Map of proposed partition

Federalism in Austria-Hungary
History of Austria-Hungary
Proposed countries
Constitutional history of Austria
1906 in Austria-Hungary
1906 in politics